The Jinhua Formation is a geological formation in Zhejiang, China, whose strata date back to the Late Cretaceous period (Turonian to Coniacian). It was initially believed to be Early Cretaceous (late Albian) in age.

Dinosaur remains are among the fossils that have been recovered from the formation.

Fossil content 
 Jiangshanosaurus lixianensis - "Partial postcranial skeleton."
 Dongyangosaurus sinensis - "Partial postcranial skeleton."

See also 
 List of dinosaur-bearing rock formations

References 

Geologic formations of China
Upper Cretaceous Series of Asia
Cretaceous China
Coniacian Stage
Turonian Stage
Paleontology in Zhejiang